, also known as Makino Castle,  was a Sengoku period Japanese castle located in what is now part of  the town of Ranzan, Hiki District, Saitama, in the Kantō region of Japan. The site was designated a National Historic Site. Its ruins have been protected as a National Historic Site, since 2008.

Background
Sugiyama Castle in located on a hill in the town of Ranzan, near the center of Saitama Prefecture at the border of the Kantō Plain and the Chichibu Mountains. It is also located on the highway connecting Hachigata Castle in northwestern Saitama with Musashi-Matsuyama Castle. The early history of the castle has been lost and it is known when it was first constructed, or by whom. It has a typical layout for a Sengoku-period mountain castle. Situated on a long and narrow ridge, to consists of a series of enclosures built on different levels, separated by clay ramparts and dry moats, and connected by narrow, winding paths with many dead ends to confuse attackers and to permit defenders to fire back from many angles from above. 

Due to its design, it was originally though that the castle was the work of the Later Hōjō clan, although arguments have been raised by historians that Hōjō castles tend to have much larger defensive engineering works, and the Uesugi clan has been advanced as another likely candidate. The date of construction is from the late 15th century to early 16th century, a period of time in which both clans contested this region. The castle was abandoned at some point  in the middle of 16th century. 

The castle site is a 30 minute walk from Musashi-Ranzan Station on the Tōbu Tōjō Line.

The castle was listed as one of the Continued Top 100 Japanese Castles in 2017.

See also
List of Historic Sites of Japan (Saitama)

References

External links 
 official site 

Castles in Saitama Prefecture
Ranzan, Saitama
Historic Sites of Japan
Ruined castles in Japan
Musashi Province